Federal elections were held in West Germany on 14 August 1949 to elect the members of the first Bundestag, with a further eight seats elected in West Berlin between 1949 and January 1952 and another eleven between February 1952 and 1953. They were the first free federal elections in West Germany since 1933 and the first after the division of the country.

Campaign
After World War II, the German Instrument of Surrender and the country's division into four Allied occupation zones, the elections were held in the Federal Republic of Germany, established under occupation statute in the three Western zones with the proclamation of its Basic Law by the Parlamentarischer Rat assembly of the West German states on 23 May 1949. Most West German parties at the time of the 1949 Bundestag election were committed to democracy, but they disagreed on what kind of democracy West Germany should become.

The Christian Democratic (CDU) leader, 73-year-old Konrad Adenauer, former mayor of Cologne and party chairman in the British Zone since March 1946, believed in moderate, non-denominational and Christian democracy, social market economy and integration with the West. In 1948 he had become president of the Parlamentarischer Rat, an office that added to his popularity as protagonist of a "state-to-be". He attacked social democracy and the British, especially dismantling.

The Social Democratic (SPD) leader, Kurt Schumacher, wanted a united, democratic and socialist Germany. Schumacher had heavily agitated against the forced merger of the Communist Party (KPD) and SPD (both in the Soviet occupation zone) into the Socialist Unity Party of Germany and he had also turned the party's course away from the working class advocacy group of the Weimar Republic towards a left-wing big tent party with distinct patriotic features. He constantly accused Adenauer of betraying national interests, culminating in his heckling at the Bundestag session of 25 September 1949: "The Chancellor of the Allies!". Schumacher criticised the Catholic Church, calling it the fifth occupying power and criticised denominational education.

Results
In the end and to the great disappointment of the Social Democrats, the CDU/CSU outnumbered them by 31.0% to 29.2% of the votes cast. Enough participating West Germans favoured Adenauer's and his coalition partners' – the liberal Free Democrats' (FDP) and the conservative German Party's (DP) – policies and promises over Schumacher's and the other left-wingers' policies to give the centre-right parties a slight majority of deputies.

To enter the Bundestag, a party had to surmount a threshold of 5% at least in one of the states or to win at least one electoral district; ten parties succeeded. A number of non-voting members (elected in 1949:2 CDU, 5 SPD, 1 FDP; joined in February 1952 by: 3 CDU, 4 SPD, 4 FDP) indirectly elected by the West Berlin legislature (Stadtverordnetenversammlung) are included below in parentheses. The French Saar Protectorate did not participate in this election.

Results by state

Constituency seats

List seats

Aftermath
Schumacher had explicitly refused a grand coalition and led his party into opposition, where it would remain until December 1966, assuming the chair of the SPD parliamentary group as minority leader. On 12 September 1949, he lost the German presidential election, defeated by FDP chairman Theodor Heuss in the second ballot. Schumacher died on 20 August 1952 of the long-term consequences of his concentration camp imprisonment during the Nazi years.

Adenauer had favoured the formation of a smaller centre-right coalition from the beginning. Nominated by the CDU/CSU faction, he was elected the first Chancellor of the Federal Republic of Germany on 15 September 1949 by an absolute majority of 202 of 402 votes. Adenauer had ensured that the votes of the predominantly Social Democrat West Berlin deputies did not count and later stated that he "naturally" had voted for himself. On 20 September, he formed the Cabinet Adenauer I of CDU/CSU, FDP, and DP ministers. Chosen as an interim Chancellor, he held the office until 1963, being re-elected three times (in 1953, in 1957 and in 1961).

Notes

References

Further reading
 

Federal elections in Germany
West German federal election
Konrad Adenauer
Federal election
West German federal election